Good Day may refer to:

Music 
 Good Day (group), a South Korean girl group
 Good Day, an album by Dog Age, 1989

Songs 
 "Good Day" (The Dresden Dolls song), 2003
 "Good Day" (Hayley Warner song), 2009
 "Good Day" (IU song), 2010
 "Good Day" (Jewel song), 2006
 "Good Day" (The Kinks song), 1984
 "Good Day" (Sean Maguire song), 1996
  "Good Day" (Tally Hall song), 2005
 "Good Day" (Zard song), 1998
 "Good Day", by Angels & Airwaves from We Don't Need to Whisper, 2006
 "Good Day", by Bombay Bicycle Club from Everything Else Has Gone Wrong, 2020
 "Good Day", by DNCE from DNCE, 2016
 "Good Day", by Luce from Luce, 2001
 "Good Day", by Nappy Roots from The Humdinger, 2007
 "Good Day", by Nektar from ...Sounds Like This, 1973
 "Good Day", by Paul Westerberg from Eventually, 1996
 "Good Day", by Twenty One Pilots from Scaled and Icy, 2021

Media

Radio
 On Air with Doug, Jen and Victoria, an American syndicated news/talk program hosted by Doug Stephan, known as Doug Stephan's Good Day for most of its existence
 "Good day!" was the phrase used by American broadcaster Paul Harvey to sign off his daily News and Comment broadcasts
 Good Day! The Paul Harvey Story, a biography by Paul J. Batura, published shortly after Harvey's death in 2009

Television
 Several local morning newscasts on Fox television stations in the United States, including:
Good Day L.A. Los Angeles, California 
 Good Day New York New York City, New York 
 Good Day Chicago, on WFLD Chicago, Illinois
Good Day DC on WTTG Washington DC
Good Day DFW on KDFW, Dallas-Fort Worth, Texas
Good Day Alabama, on WBRC, Birmingham, Alabama
Good Day Philadelphia, on WTXF-TV Philadelphia, Pennsylvania
Good Day Tampa Bay, on WTVT Tampa/St. Petersburg, Florida 
Good Day Atlanta, on WAGA Atlanta, Georgia
Colorado Morning News on FOX31 Good Day, on KDVR, Denver, Colorado
Good Day Orlando, on WOFL Orlando/Daytona Beach/Melbourne, Florida
Good Day Charlotte, on WJZY Belmont-Charlotte, North Carolina
Good Day Austin, on KTBC Austin, Texas
Good Day Maine, on WPFO, Portland, Maine
Good Day Columbus, on WSYX/WTTE, Columbus, Ohio
Good Day Oregon, on KPTV, Portland, Oregon
Good Day Wisconsin, on WLUK-TV, Green Bay, Wisconsin
Good Day Seattle, on KCPQ, Seattle, Washington 
"Good Day", a television-news music package, produced by Frank Gari, used by some Good Day programs
 Good Day!, a morning show on WCVB-TV in Boston, Massachusetts that ran between 1973 and 1991
Good Day (formerly Good Day Sacramento), a local morning newscast on CW affiliate KMAX-TV, Sacramento, California

Religion 
 "Good Day" is the literal translation of the Hebrew  (Yom Tov, plural  Yamim Tovim) used to refer to a Jewish holiday or holidays

See also
 Good Days (disambiguation)
 A Good Day (disambiguation)
 G'day (wiktionary), an Australian greeting
 Goedendag, a Medieval Flemish weapon whose name means "Good day" in Dutch
 "Good Day Sunshine", a 1966 song by the Beatles
 "It's a Good Day", a 1946 song by Peggy Lee and Dave Barbour
 "It Was a Good Day", a 1993 song by Ice Cube